Neu-Westend is a Berlin U-Bahn station on line U2. It opened in 1922 and was built by A. Grenander. In 1986 the station was renovated, but the original eastern entrance was kept.

References

External links

U2 (Berlin U-Bahn) stations
Buildings and structures in Charlottenburg-Wilmersdorf
Railway stations in Germany opened in 1922